Anogdus is a genus of round fungus beetles in the family Leiodidae. There are at least 16 described species in Anogdus.

Taxonomic note:
Peck & Cook (2013:3) note 'The genus is Nearctic in published distribution, with unpublished material known from the Neotropics,' so future work is likely to reveal new neotropical species, and/or expand the range of known species.

Species
 Anogdus alachua Peck and Cook, 2013
 Anogdus capitatus LeConte, 1866
 Anogdus cochise Peck and Cook, 2013
 Anogdus dissimilis Blatchley, 1916
 Anogdus fusciclavus (Fall, 1925)
 Anogdus huachuca Peck and Cook, 2013
 Anogdus insolitus (Brown, 1937)
 Anogdus obsoletus (Melsheimer, 1844)
 Anogdus potens (Brown, 1932)
 Anogdus puritanus (Fall, 1925)
 Anogdus rileyi Peck and Cook, 2013
 Anogdus sculpturatus (Fall, 1910)
 Anogdus secretus (Brown, 1937)
 Anogdus superans (Fall, 1910)
 Anogdus texanus Peck and Cook, 2013
 Anogdus tridens Peck and Cook, 2013

References

 Peck, Stewart B. / Arnett, Ross H. Jr. and Michael C. Thomas, eds. (2001). "Family 19. Leiodidae Fleming, 1821". American Beetles, vol. 1: Archostemata, Myxophaga, Adephaga, Polyphaga: Staphyliniformia, 250–258.
 Peck, Stewart B., and Joyce Cook (2013). "A revision of the species of Anogdus LeConte of the United States and Canada (Coleoptera: Leiodidae: Leiodinae: Leiodini)". Insecta Mundi, no. 0290, 1-27.

Further reading

 NCBI Taxonomy Browser, Anogdus
 Arnett, R.H. Jr., M. C. Thomas, P. E. Skelley and J. H. Frank. (eds.). (2002). American Beetles, Volume II: Polyphaga: Scarabaeoidea through Curculionoidea. CRC Press LLC, Boca Raton, FL.
 Arnett, Ross H. (2000). American Insects: A Handbook of the Insects of America North of Mexico. CRC Press.
 Richard E. White. (1983). Peterson Field Guides: Beetles. Houghton Mifflin Company.

Leiodidae